Mon premier amour is a 1978 French film.

Cast 
 Anouk Aimée - Jane Romain
 Richard Berry - Richard
 Nathalie Baye - Fabienne
 Gabriele Ferzetti - Georges
 Jacques Villeret - Jacques Labrousse
 Gilles Ségal - Professor
 Nicole Seguin - Carole
 Arlette Gordon - Sarah
 Jacques Ebner - Night porter
 René Bouloc - Taxi driver
 Stéphane Nachba - Richard, child
 Bernard-Pierre Donnadieu - Café owner

References

External links

1978 films
French romantic drama films
Films directed by Élie Chouraqui
Films scored by Michel Legrand
1970s French films